Police Academy 3: Back in Training is a 1986 American comedy film directed by Jerry Paris. It is the third installment of the Police Academy franchise and the sequel to Police Academy 2: Their First Assignment.

Despite receiving generally negative reviews, it was an overall box office success, earning $107 million against a budget of $12 million.

Plot
In a large parking garage, Lt. Proctor (Lance Kinsey) and Commandant Mauser (Art Metrano) meet with Sgts. Chad Copeland (Scott Thomson) and Kyle Blankes (Brant van Hoffman) from Commandant Lassard's police academy. One of the two police academies is going to be phased out by the state government due to budgetary restraints, and Mauser wants them to ensure Lassard fails. Agreeing to the plan, they see it as revenge against Lassard for graduating them at the bottom of their class.

The following day, after the governor (Ed Nelson) announces he will appoint a committee to evaluate which academy will remain open, Mauser lightly cajoles him. Sgt. Jones (Michael Winslow) undermines him by subtly humiliating him in front of the governor. Commandant Lassard (George Gaynes) realizes how to win: with Sgt. Jones and Lt. Callahan (Leslie Easterbrook), he calls back Sgt. Mahoney (Steve Guttenberg), Sgt. Hooks (Marion Ramsey), Sgt. Hightower (Bubba Smith), and Sgt. Tackleberry (David Graf) as trainers for the new recruits.

Among those are Sgt. Fackler's (Bruce Mahler) wife Violet (Debralee Scott), who he opposes joining the force; Sweetchuck (Tim Kazurinsky) and Zed (Bobcat Goldthwait), who have a history as Zed's gang had harassed him when he was a small shop owner; Karen Adams (Shawn Weatherly), a beautiful young woman Mahoney is attracted to but who rejects him; and Tackleberry's brother-in-law Bud Kirkland (Andrew Paris). Tomoko Nogata (Brian Tochi), initially a recruit of Mauser's academy, is transferred by Mauser into Lassard's instead, in the hopes of sabotaging it.

After a few weeks of training, Nogata is lovestruck by Callahan. Sweetchuck contemplates quitting as Zed, who he has to room with, drives him crazy; but Tackleberry dissuades him, taking him under his wing. Copeland and Blankes make the recruits do things so the committee questions their competence. At the recruits' initial failure, Mauser and Proctor tease them. In retaliation, Mahoney tapes Mauser's eyes closed with extremely strong tape while doing a taste test. Proctor removes the tape, but unintentionally pulls off Mauser's eyebrows.

Lassard and Mahoney give a pep talk to the cadets before training resumes. Adams finally warms up to Mahoney after the talk, and they bond. At the policepersons' ball, Mahoney sees his prostitute friend (Georgina Spelvin), and after Proctor insults him and Adams, he has her trick Proctor into stripping naked and then locks him out of the hotel room. Trying to get back to the academy, Proctor accidentally enters the Blue Oyster Bar. Meanwhile, Mauser insults Lassard in front of the recruits by telling him that he is winning. Mahoney retaliates by giving a speech at the ball and puts the microphone in water, so when Mauser grabs it, he gets a shock.

On the final day of the cadet training/evaluation competition, one recruit from each academy attends the governor's ball (Proctor misunderstands and sends two, one of whom is portrayed by David James Elliott). Copeland and Blankes manipulate the computer system, deliberately sending cars to the wrong locations to help Mauser win. Hooks catches them, knocking them out cold. At the governor's party, a gang of thieves dressed as busboys rob the guests, taking the governor hostage. Mauser's cadets promptly faint upon being threatened by the thieves, but Lassard's cadet Hedges (David Huband) alerts the team before being taken hostage. Mahoney and company rush to rescue the governor. Mauser's academy is ineffective in reacting to the emergency, but Lassard's squad arrives in time to fight off the thieves and rescue the governor.

The governor shuts down Mauser's academy for failing to stop the robbery at the party, so Lassard's stays open. In the epilogue, Lassard speaks about the academy's gratitude for the "many, many" recruits. The graduating class salutes the camera as the film ends.

Cast

Lassard Academy
 Steve Guttenberg as Sergeant Carey Mahoney
 Bubba Smith as Sergeant Moses Hightower
 David Graf as Sergeant Eugene Tackleberry
 Michael Winslow as Sergeant Larvell Jones
 Leslie Easterbrook as Lieutenant Debbie Callahan
 Marion Ramsey as Sergeant Laverne Hooks
 Bruce Mahler as Sergeant Douglas Fackler
 George Gaynes as Commandant Eric Lassard
 Scott Thomson as Sergeant Chad Copeland
 Brant von Hoffman as Sergeant Kyle Blankes

Mauser Academy
 Art Metrano as Commandant Ernie Mauser
 Lance Kinsey as Lieutenant Carl Proctor

Lassard's Cadets
 Debralee Scott as Cadet Violet Fackler
 Tim Kazurinsky as Cadet Carl Sweetchuck
 Brian Tochi as Cadet Tomoko Nogata
 Andrew Paris as Cadet Bud Kirkland
 Bobcat Goldthwait as Cadet Zed McGlunk
 Shawn Weatherly as Cadet Karen Adams
 David Huband as Cadet Hedges
 Marcia Watkins as Cadet Sarah

Mauser's Cadets 
 R. Christopher Thomas as Cadet Baxter #1
 David James Elliott as Cadet Baxter #2

Others
 George R. Robertson as Commissioner Henry Hurst
 Ed Nelson as Governor Neilson
 Georgina Spelvin as Hooker
 Arthur Batanides as Mr. Kirkland
 Chas Lawther as Mr. Delaney
 Doug Lennox as Main Bad Guy
 TJ Scott as Robber
 Jerry Paris as Priest

Production

Filming

As with other films in the series, the film was shot primarily in Toronto, Ontario, Canada . The city skyline is clearly identifiable in the concluding 'yacht club' scenes. There is also the scene where the female recruit drives the police car up and over a dirt pile out of an alley. At the end of the alley, there is a Toronto Sun paper box. The city grid shown on the computerized dispatch system also shows a map of downtown Toronto streets, with the detail bordering between Trinity, Yonge, and Queen streets, and the Gardiner Expressway. In the scene in which Tackleberry shoots out the television screen with his gun, a Canada Dry soda machine is visible in the background next to a 'C' Plus soda machine, an orange flavoured sparkling beverage that is only sold in Canada.

Reception

Box office
The film debuted at number one at the box office in the United States. The film grossed $43,579,163 in the United States making it the 17th highest-grossing film of 1986 in the United States. It faced stiff box office competition from many other high-profile comedy films released early that year such as Back To School, Ruthless People, Ferris Bueller's Day Off, Down And Out In Beverly Hills, Legal Eagles, Short Circuit, Running Scared, The Money Pit, Gung Ho, Hannah and Her Sisters, Wildcats, and Jo Jo Dancer, Your Life Is Calling. The film grossed $107,639,000 worldwide from a budget of $12 million.

Critical response
On Rotten Tomatoes, it has an approval rating of 40% based on reviews from 10 critics. On Metacritic, it has a score of 33 out of 100 based on reviews from 8 critics, indicating "generally unfavorable reviews". Audiences polled by CinemaScore gave the film a grade 
B+.

Variety wrote: "Cast of cartoon misfits is still basically intact and if Police Academy 3 has any charm it’s in the good-natured dopeyness of these people. No bones about it, these people are there to laugh at."
Kevin Thomas of the Los Angeles Times wrote: "The most you can say for “Police Academy 3: Back in Training” (citywide) is that it’s no worse than “Police Academy 2"—which was awful."

References

External links
 
 
 
 

3
1986 films
1980s American films
1980s English-language films
1980s police comedy films
1986 comedy films
American sequel films
Films directed by Jerry Paris
Films scored by Robert Folk
Films shot in Toronto
Films produced by Paul Maslansky
Films with screenplays by Gene Quintano
Warner Bros. films